Arthur von Ferraris (or di Ferraris) (1856–1936) was a Hungarian-born artist known for his portraits of society figures of his day and for his "orientalist" paintings. 

Von Ferraris was born in Galkovitz, Hungary but moved to Vienna as a teenager to study with Joseph Matthaus Aigner. In 1876, at twenty, he moved to Paris to study with Jules Lefebvre. Von Ferraris spent time in Egypt and painted street scenes and market scenes that captured the imagination of the art world when he returned to Paris. In the late 1880s he shared a studio with Charles Wilda, a painter also known for his "orientalist" themes. His works from many countries made him known as a "citizen of the world."

Von Ferraris had "considerable success" as a society portrait painter. He exhibited these and his Orientalist works at the Salon des Artistes Francais in the 1880s and 1990s. One notable portrait von Ferraris painted was John Davison Rockefeller, in 1903. He also painted portraits of Edward M. Shepard, Johannes Schober, Felix M. Warburg, and other notables.   

One of his most famous paintings is of the mythological story "Leda and the Swan."

Von Ferraris's grandson is the designer Tom Karen.

References

1856 births
19th-century Hungarian painters
Hungarian male painters
Orientalist painters
1936 deaths